Hanna Erica Maria Glas (born 16 April 1993) is a Swedish footballer who plays as a defender for  Frauen-Bundesliga club Bayern Munich and the Sweden national team.

Club career 

Glas began her football career at Sundsvalls DFF of Sweden's second division, the Elitettan. Glas' first experience with a professional team was in 2013, when she joined Sunnanå SK of the Damallsvenskan. In March 2013, Glas suffered the second ACL tear of her career in a pre-season match against Umeå IK. As a result, she missed the entire 2013 Damallsvenskan season.

In November 2013, she joined Umeå IK and played sixteen matches in her first season, scoring two goals. At the end of the 2014 Damallsvenskan season, Glas extended her contract with Umeå for another year. Glas played most of the 2015 Damallsvenskan season before tearing her ACL for the third time in September 2015 in a match against Kopparberg/Goeteborg FC (now BK Häcken). Ahead of the 2016 season, she extended her contract at the club by two years. She spent most of the season rehabilitating her injury, and was back in action at the end of August, playing 10 games for the club. At the end of the 2016 season, Umeå were relegated to the Elitettan after 19 straight seasons in Sweden's top division.

In November 2016, Glas left relegated Umeå IK to sign a two-year contract with Eskilstuna United. In 2018, she transferred to Paris Saint-Germain. Glas made just five league appearances in her second season with PSG. She joined Bayern Munich on a three-year deal in 2020.

On 25 April 2021, in the first leg of Bayern's UEFA Women's Champions League semifinal against Chelsea, Glas gave an assist to Sydney Lohmann and then scored Bayern's match-winner. In the second leg, Bayern were defeated 4–1 by Chelsea. On 19 May 2021, UEFA selected Glas' goal against Chelsea as the best goal of the 2020–21 tournament. On 6 June 2021, Glas earned the first major club title of her career when Bayern became Frauen-Bundesliga champions for the first time since 2016.

Glas missed the entire 2022–2023 Frauen Bundesliga season when she tore her ACL for a fourth time in September 2022 during a training session with the national team.

International career
In 2009, Glas played for Sweden's U-17 national team, and in 2010, suffered the first ACL injury of her career in a training session with the team. She later went on to play for Sweden's under-19 football team, and was an important part of the squad that won the 2012 UEFA Women's Under-19 Championship.

Glas was selected for the Swedish national team in 2015 to compete in UEFA Women's Euro 2017 qualifying after having had a strong club season in 2015, but her third ACL injury made it so she was unable to join the squad. On 19 January 2017, Glas finally made her debut in the national team in a 2–1 loss against Norway. In 2019, she was a part of Sweden's squad that finished third place in the 2019 FIFA Women's World Cup. In 2021, she was a starter in Sweden's 2020 Tokyo Olympics campaign where they won a silver medal.

Career statistics

International

Scores and results list Sweden's goal tally first, score column indicates score after each Glas goal.

Honours

Club 
Bayern Munich
Frauen-Bundesliga: 2020–21

International 
Sweden U19
 UEFA Women's Under-19 Championship: 2012

Sweden
FIFA Women's World Cup Third Place: 2019
Olympics Silver medal: 2020

References

External links 
 
 

1993 births
Living people
Swedish women's footballers
People from Sundsvall
Women's association football defenders
Sunnanå SK players
Umeå IK players
Eskilstuna United DFF players
Damallsvenskan players
Paris Saint-Germain Féminine players
FC Bayern Munich (women) players
Swedish expatriate women's footballers
Swedish expatriate sportspeople in France
Expatriate women's footballers in France
2019 FIFA Women's World Cup players
Sweden women's international footballers
Division 1 Féminine players
Footballers at the 2020 Summer Olympics
Olympic footballers of Sweden
Olympic medalists in football
Medalists at the 2020 Summer Olympics
Olympic silver medalists for Sweden
Women's association football fullbacks
Sundsvalls DFF players
Sportspeople from Västernorrland County
UEFA Women's Euro 2022 players
UEFA Women's Euro 2017 players